Hamlin Valentine Snell (February 14, 1810 – January 29, 1886) was an American lawyer and politician in Florida. He served as speaker of the Florida House of Representatives, was president of the Florida State Senate, and was the eighth mayor of Tampa, Florida.

He was born in Savannah, Georgia. He was William H. Whitaker's half-brother.

Snell originally moved to Florida in the late 1830s. In 1840 he'd be elected as Calhoun County's representative to the Territorial Legislative Council. He'd move once more again to what is today Sarasota in 1842 where he started a guava plantation.

Snell moved to Tampa sometime in late 1857. He became the Port of Tampa's deputy collector in June 1858. He'd serve as the Mayor of Tampa from February 1, 1860, until February 2, 1861. As mayor, he celebrated the start of the American Civil War. Martial law was declared in Tampa on April 21, 1861, by the 20th Florida Regiment after it had taken control of Fort Brooke. Close to three weeks after martial law was declared, he fled Tampa like many other citizens of the city at the time. He married Mary Beville in 1867. Local artist Ruth Finney Horney painted a portrait of him.

He died on January 29, 1886, in Gainesville, Florida.

See also
List of mayors of Tampa, Florida
List of speakers of the Florida House of Representatives
List of presidents of the Florida Senate

References

1810 births
1886 deaths
19th-century American politicians
Mayors of Tampa, Florida
Politicians from Savannah, Georgia
Members of the Florida Territorial Legislature
Speakers of the Florida House of Representatives
Democratic Party members of the Florida House of Representatives
Presidents of the Florida Senate
Democratic Party Florida state senators
19th-century American lawyers
Florida lawyers